Carl Eduard Anton Körber (4 June 1802 Tartu County – 4 May 1883) was a Baltic-German pastor and writer.

From 1820 to 1823 he studied theology at Tartu University. From 1841 to 1859 he was a pastor of Vändra Congregation.

He was a member of Learned Estonian Society.

Works

Besides religious publications, he also published primers, textbooks, dictionaries, translations of children's books.

 "Joosepi elloramat", 1850
 "Lomisse ramat", 1851
 series of textbooks "Koli-ramat", 1954

References

1802 births
1883 deaths
Estophiles
Baltic-German people